Lymantica polycyma is a moth of the family Erebidae. It is found in eastern Madagascar.

This species looks similar to Lymantica malgassica (Kenrick, 1914) but smaller, with shorter antennae and no trace of pink in the body, wings and legs and with very distinctive genitalia.

References

Lymantriinae
Moths described in 1936
Moths of Madagascar
Moths of Africa